John Plytos was a senior official and provincial governor of the Despotate of Epirus and the Empire of Thessalonica under Theodore Komnenos Doukas.

The sebastos John Plytos served as governor (doux) of Krujë (where his friend, Gregory Kamonas, had ruled in ), of Ohrid, and of Veroia. He was later raised to the rank of panhypersebastos and appointed as mesazon (chief minister) of Theodore Komnenos Doukas.

References

Sources
 

13th-century Byzantine people
Byzantine governors
Byzantine officials
People of the Despotate of Epirus
Sebastoi
Panhypersebastoi